La Puebla de los Infantes is a city located in the province of Seville, Spain. According to the 2005 census (INE), the city has a population of 3263 inhabitants.

References

External links
www.lapuebladelosinfantes.es - Web of the Town hall of La Puebla de los Infantes
La Puebla de los Infantes - Sistema de Información Multiterritorial de Andalucía

Municipalities of the Province of Seville